Kesknädal (Estonian for 'Midweek') is a weekly newspaper issued every Wednesday. The paper was started in 1999. It is the organ of the Centre Party, a left-leaning Estonian party.

The paper has been criticized for hiring notable Soviet-era journalists such as Ralf R. Parve, and sometimes accused of harbouring Soviet-like journalistic culture.

References

External links

1999 establishments in Estonia
Estonian-language newspapers
Mass media in Tallinn
Newspapers published in Estonia
Publications established in 1999
Weekly newspapers